is a Japanese idol singer and rapper. She has an active solo career.

Discography

Singles

Albums

DVD 
 （June 27, 2013）

Music videos

Filmography

Film
 Humanoid Monster Bela (2020)
 Between Us (2021)

References

External links 
 
 Rinne Yoshida's profile at Victor Entertainment

2000 births
Living people
Japanese idols
Japanese rappers
Victor Entertainment artists
People from Sapporo